From the Start may refer to:

"From the Start", Jazz chart #1 single by Steve Cole from Between Us
"From the Start", a song by Ryan Cabrera from You Stand Watching
"From the Start", a song by B. J. Thomas, 1979
"From the Start" a song of Rachelle Ann Go, 2004
"From the Start", a song by Chad Gilbert from That New Sound You're Looking For, 2015